Mário Sérgio Leal Nogueira (born 28 July 1981), known as Mário Sérgio, is a Portuguese professional footballer who plays for F.C. Maia Lidador as a right-back.

He amassed Primeira Liga totals of 137 matches and three goals over eight seasons, representing Paços de Ferreira, Sporting CP, Vitória de Guimarães and Naval. Abroad, he played for Metalurh Donetsk, APOEL and Apollon Limassol, winning seven major titles with the second club.

Mário Sérgio appeared with Portugal at the 2004 Olympic Games.

Club career

Portugal
Born in Paredes, Mário Sérgio was a youth graduate of F.C. Paços de Ferreira, making his Primeira Liga debut on 1 October 2000 by playing four minutes in a 4–1 home win against C.F. Estrela da Amadora. He was first choice the following two seasons.

Mário Sérgio joined Sporting CP on 25 June 2003 on a four-year contract, being the first signing of manager Fernando Santos; he said upon his arrival: "I am an ambitious player. I have fought for this opportunity and now want to show my worth". However, three years later and with only 18 competitive appearances to his credit, also being loaned to fellow league side Vitória de Guimarães, he was released.

Immediately after leaving the Lions, Mário Sérgio signed for two years with Associação Naval 1º de Maio also in the top division. He was an undisputed starter during his tenure, scoring his third and last league goal on 14 January 2007 to contribute to a 3–0 away victory over Vitória de Setúbal.

Metalurh Donetsk
On 27 July 2008, Mário Sérgio moved to FC Metalurh Donetsk for an undisclosed fee. He made his Ukrainian Premier League on 19 August, in a 1–0 home defeat of FC Karpaty Lviv.

Mário Sérgio renewed his link for two more years on 25 September 2009, keeping him at the club until 2012. In March 2012, he became the first player to appear in 100 league games for Metalurh, achieving this feat against SC Tavriya Simferopol; he was released midway through that month alongside two other players, however, having scored twice in the competition, both goals coming against Karpaty in September 2011.

APOEL
On 15 May 2012, Mário Sérgio signed a two-year deal with Cypriot club APOEL FC, scoring his first goal against Alki Larnaca FC in a last-minute equaliser. He also participated with the team in the qualifying phase of the UEFA Europa League, netting against Aalesunds FK in a 2–1 home victory. He won the First Division at the end of his debut campaign, which was the first major accolade of his career.

On 17 August 2013, APOEL beat Apollon Limassol FC 1–0 to win the Cypriot Super Cup and Mário Sérgio scored a rare goal in the 35th minute. During the season, he appeared in five games in the group stage of the Europa League, and helped his side conquer the treble as they went on to add the league and the Cup.

Mário Sérgio agreed to a two-year extension on 6 December 2014, running until June 2017.

Later years
On 30 December 2016, after he cut ties with APOEL, free agent Mário Sérgio signed a six-month deal with Apollon Limassol with an option for a further season. He subsequently returned to his homeland, where he played for Varzim S.C. and F.C. Felgueiras 1932.

International career
Mário Sérgio played for the Portuguese under-21s for two years, representing the nation at the 2004 UEFA European Championship, and was also in squad for the 2004 Summer Olympics football tournament. He won his first cap for the former on 15 October 2002, in a 4–2 loss in Turkey in the 2004 European Championship qualifiers.

Career statistics

Honours
APOEL
Cypriot First Division: 2012–13, 2013–14, 2014–15, 2015–16
Cypriot Cup: 2013–14, 2014–15
Cypriot Super Cup: 2013

References

External links
APOEL official profile

1981 births
Living people
People from Paredes, Portugal
Sportspeople from Porto District
Portuguese footballers
Association football defenders
Primeira Liga players
Liga Portugal 2 players
Campeonato de Portugal (league) players
F.C. Paços de Ferreira players
Sporting CP footballers
Vitória S.C. players
Associação Naval 1º de Maio players
Varzim S.C. players
F.C. Felgueiras 1932 players
F.C. Maia players
Ukrainian Premier League players
FC Metalurh Donetsk players
Cypriot First Division players
APOEL FC players
Apollon Limassol FC players
Portugal youth international footballers
Portugal under-21 international footballers
Portugal B international footballers
Olympic footballers of Portugal
Footballers at the 2004 Summer Olympics
Portuguese expatriate footballers
Expatriate footballers in Ukraine
Expatriate footballers in Cyprus
Portuguese expatriate sportspeople in Ukraine
Portuguese expatriate sportspeople in Cyprus